The Aerotec A-132 Tangará (originally the Uirapuru II) was a Brazilian military trainer aircraft developed from the A-122 Uirapuru of the 1960s.

Design and development
The A-132 Tangará was developed in response to a request from the Brazilian Air Force. Compared to its predecessor, the Uirapuru II had a longer fuselage, greater wingspan, larger fin, more powerful engine, and a redesigned, flat-sided fuselage. A similar aircraft with a less powerful engine was planned for the civil market. The prototype first flew on 26 February 1981.

The Air Force originally had the intention to order 100 units but after a decision that the primary trainer should have tandem seats, the project was abandoned. The only orders came from the Bolivian Air Force, which ordered 6 units in 1986 and flew them until 1992. The prototype was given to the Air Force Technical Institute in 1990 where it was used for tests until 2004. It was then passed on to the Aeroclube de Sao Jose dos Campos, where it was flying with experimental restrictions, with a  engine from a Socata ST-10 Diplomate.

Variants
 A-132A – Military trainer
 A-132B – Civil version (planned)

Operators
 
 Bolivian Air Force

Specifications (prototype)

See also

References

 Tayor, John W. R., and Munson Kenneth. Jane's All The World's Aircraft 1981–1982 edition, London: Jane's Publishing Company Limited,1981 

  
 

1980s Brazilian military trainer aircraft
Tangara
Single-engined tractor aircraft
Low-wing aircraft
Aircraft first flown in 1981